The 2022 Mountain West Conference Football Championship Game was a college football game which was played on December 3, 2022, at Albertsons Stadium in Boise, Idaho. It was the tenth edition of the Mountain West Conference Football Championship Game and determined the champion of the Mountain West Conference (MWC) for the 2022 season. The game began at 2:00 p.m. MST and aired on Fox. The game featured the Boise State Broncos, the Mountain Division champions, and the Fresno State Bulldogs, the West Division champions. Boise State won the right to host the game as a result of defeating the Fresno State Bulldogs earlier in the 2022 season.

Previous season
The 2021 Mountain West Conference Football Championship Game featured Utah State against San Diego State. In the championship game, Utah State was victorious by a score of 46–13, winning its first Mountain West championship.

Teams

Fresno State Bulldogs

Fresno State clinched their spot in the championship game following their defeat of Nevada on November 19. Following a disappointing 1-4 start to the season, the Bulldogs won their next 6 games.

Boise State Broncos

Boise State clinched their spot in the championship game following their defeat of Wyoming on November 19. The win also ensured they would host the game.

Game summary

References

Championship Game
Mountain West Conference Football Championship Game
Boise State Broncos football games
Fresno State Bulldogs football games
Mountain West Conference Football Championship Game
Mountain West Conference Football Championship Game